Jerome is a small unincorporated community in Collier County, Florida, United States. It lies along State Road 29 north of Copeland and south of Deep Lake at an elevation of 10 feet (3 m). In the 1950s, Jerome housed the largest steam-powered lumber mill in the American South, until it burned down in 1956.

Jerome is part of the Naples–Marco Island Metropolitan Statistical Area.

See also

References

External links

Unincorporated communities in Collier County, Florida
Unincorporated communities in Florida